Jenna Lamia is an American actress, writer, and audiobook narrator.

Career

Acting
Lamia began her acting career in New York City, where she appeared on Broadway in Eugene O'Neill's Ah, Wilderness! at Lincoln Center. She soon moved on to television and film appearances, and is best known for her roles as Sherri Ward in The Fighter with Mark Wahlberg and Christian Bale, Siobhan Miller in Law and Order: SVU, Carrie Schillinger in Oz, and as Poppy Downes in Comedy Central's Strangers With Candy, with Amy Sedaris. Over the span of her career, she has appeared on and off-Broadway, in over 30 television shows and feature films, and voiced video games and animated characters for film and television. As of 2021, she appears as Judy Cooper in the Syfy television series Resident Alien, starring Alan Tudyk.

Audiobook narration
As an audiobook narrator, Lamia has won several golden earphones awards from AudioFile magazine, and was named Female Narrator of the Year in 2010 by the Audio Publishers Association. Also in 2010, she won Best Solo Narration - Female for The Chosen One. She voiced Eugenia "Skeeter" Phelan in The Help, which won best fiction audiobook of the year in 2010. In 2020, she won another Audie Award as part of the ensemble cast of Jarrett Krozocska's Hey, Kiddo.

Writing and producing
Lamia is also a writer and producer of television and films. After selling her first feature script, All About Me, to New Line Cinema in 2006, she joined the writing staff of The CW's 90210. After 90210, Lamia went on to write, produce, and act in Awkward.

She began writing and producing the dramedy No Tomorrow in 2016. In 2017, she began writing and co-executive producing the crime comedy-drama Good Girls for NBC.

In December 2019, it was announced that she would write and executive produce an adaptation of Elin Hilderbrand's novel The Perfect Couple, for the Fox network. 

In April 2021, production began on the feature film My Best Friend's Exorcism, which Lamia adapted from the 2016 novel by Grady Hendrix.

In August 2022, Netflix announced it would produce the limited series The Perfect Couple, which Lamia will write and executive produce. The series is an adaptation of The New York Times bestselling novel by Elin Hilderbrand.

Filmography

Acting

Writing

Television

Film

Awards and nominations

References

External links
 

American television actresses
Living people
American stage actresses
American voice actresses
American film actresses
21st-century American actresses
Year of birth missing (living people)
American television writers
American women television writers
21st-century American screenwriters
21st-century American women writers
Actresses from Los Angeles
Writers from Los Angeles
Screenwriters from California